Goin' Home: A Tribute to Fats Domino is a 2007 tribute album by various artists to Fats Domino, issued by Vanguard Records.

History

In contrast to an earlier tribute album, That's Fats: A Tribute to Fats Domino (Capitol, 1996), which mostly contained previously released cover versions, Goin' Home: A Tribute to Fats Domino is (with the exception of the opening track, by John Lennon) composed of newly recorded versions.  The album is critically described as "...one of the more remarkable tribute albums to surface in recent years...(s)panning the worlds of rock (Neil Young, Elton John, Los Lobos, Tom Petty), blues (B.B. King), country (Willie Nelson), jazz (Herbie Hancock), and even reggae (Toots & the Maytals, who just nail "Let the Four Winds Blow")..."

Track listing and performer credits

"Ain't That a Shame" (Domino, Bartholomew)  John Lennon
"I'm Walkin'" (Domino, Bartholomew) Tom Petty & The Heartbreakers
"Goin' Home" (Domino, Bartholomew) Ivan Neville's DumpstaPhunk and B.B. King
"Blueberry Hill" (Rose, Lewis, Stock)  Elton John
"My Girl Josephine" (Domino, Bartholomew)  Taj Mahal and the New Orleans Social Club
"Every Night About This Time" (Domino, Bartholomew) Buddy Guy, the Dirty Dozen Brass Band and Joss Stone
"I Want to Walk You Home" (Domino, Bartholomew) Allen Toussaint and Paul McCartney
"Whole Lotta Lovin'" (Domino, Bartholomew) Rebirth Brass Band, Troy "Trombone Shorty" Andrews, Pee Wee Ellis, Fred Wesley, Maceo Parker and Lenny Kravitz
"Don't Leave Me This Way" (Domino, Bartholomew)  Dr. John
"I'm in Love Again/All by Myself"  (Domino, Bartholomew) Jon Cleary and Bonnie Raitt
"Please Don't Leave Me" (Domino)  Art Neville
"Going to the River" (Domino, Bartholomew)  Robbie Robertson and Galactic
"Blue Monday" (Domino, Bartholomew) Randy Newman
"It Keeps Rainin'" (Domino, Bartholomew, Guidry) Lil' Band o' Gold and Robert Plant
"One Night (Of Sin)" (Bartholomew, King) Corinne Bailey Rae
"Walking to New Orleans" (Domino, Bartholomew, Guidry) Neil Young
"Valley of Tears" (Domino, Bartholomew) Robert Plant and the Soweto Gospel Choir
"My Blue Heaven" (Donaldson, Whiting)  Norah Jones
"Honey Chile" (Domino, Bartholomew) Lucinda Williams
"Rising Sun" (Domino) Sam Bush and Marc Broussard
"When I See You" (Domino, Bartholomew) Olu Dara and the Natchezippi Band with Donald Harrison, Jr.
"Be My Guest" (Boyce, Domino, Marascalco) Skatalites and Ben Harper
"Let the Four Winds Blow" (Domino, Bartholomew)  Toots & the Maytals
"I Hear You Knockin'" (Bartholomew, King) Willie Nelson
"I Just Can't Get New Orleans Off My Mind" (Domino) Irma Thomas and Marcia Ball
"Don't Blame It on Me" (Domino, Bartholomew) Bruce Hornsby
"I'm Gonna Be a Wheel Someday" (Domino, Bartholomew, Hayes) Herbie Hancock, Ziggy Modeliste and Renard Poche
"The Fat Man" (Domino, Bartholomew) Los Lobos
"So Long" (Domino, Bartholomew) Big Chief Monk Boudreaux and Galactic
"When the Saints Go Marching In" (traditional) Preservation Hall Jazz Band and Theresa Andersson

Other credits
Adam Shipley  Executive Producer
Bill Taylor Executive Producer, Liner Notes
Tim Donnelly Creative Consultant
Bill Bentley Advisor

References 

2007 compilation albums
Fats Domino tribute albums
Vanguard Records compilation albums